Anna Zatuşevscaia (born 12 March 1995) is a Moldovan footballer who plays as a goalkeeper and has appeared for the Moldova women's national team.

Career
Zatuşevscaia has been capped for the Moldova national team, appearing for the team during the 2019 FIFA Women's World Cup qualifying cycle.

References

External links
 
 
 

1995 births
Living people
Moldovan women's footballers
Moldova women's international footballers
Women's association football goalkeepers
FC Noroc Nimoreni players